Philip Christopher Harvey (born 29 August 1976) is an English creative director best known as the fifth member of the rock band Coldplay. He financed the extended play Safety (1998) and single-handedly managed the group during their early years. They signed with Parlophone in 1999 and found global fame through the release of Parachutes (2000) and subsequent records.

After separating from the band for four years due to overworking, he returned to the line-up as a creative director, making cameo appearances in many of their music videos as well. He won a Grammy Award for Record of the Year as part of Coldplay. They have sold over 100 million albums worldwide as of 2021, making them the most successful group of the 21st century.

Early life
Philip Christopher Harvey was born on 29 August 1976 in Bristol, England. Raised in Devon, he later attended Sherborne School from 1990 to 1995 along with Chris Martin. They have been friends since 13 years old and were on a band of soul and R&B covers called "The Rockin' Honkies", where Harvey was "a guitarist with no talent, so I was substituted out to become the sound engineer". He enrolled on a Classical Studies degree at Trinity College, Oxford, dropping out to become Coldplay's manager.

Career

Managing

While in college, Harvey used to work at local nightclubs setting up and promoting student nights, describing it as "pretty basic stuff, but it at least gave me a vague idea of what it is to hire a venue, book a band or DJ and try and make a little money". After Martin complained about the "vice-like grip" one of the Camden promoters had on Coldplay, he said the group should book their own concert at Dingwalls, where they managed to sell 50 copies of Safety (1998). The extended play was funded with help from his father and an Oxford roommate, while the event is considered when Harvey began to manage the band, eventually dropping out of university to dedicate himself to the role entirely. They later wrote the song "Brothers & Sisters", and released it as their debut single through a short term contract with Fierce Panda Records.

In April 1999, Coldplay signed a record deal with Parlophone at Trafalgar Square, while publishing was handled by BMG Publishing. Harvey carried out his role single-handedly until early 2001, when the stress of an occupation that usually requires a team forced him into a break: "The album went straight in at No.1 and all of a sudden I was working 16 hours a day with three phone lines ringing constantly. Only later that I discovered most international bands have huge teams supporting them". He also affirmed the 21st Brit Awards was his lowest point, as Coldplay had won British Group and British Album of the Year, but he was "feeling like death" and only thought about "how much I wanted to be in bed". Once the recording sessions for A Rush of Blood to the Head (2002) were finished, he decided to leave the band and dedicate himself to personal endeavours.

Creative direction

Harvey's assistant (Estelle Wilkinson) and the group's American manager (Dave Holmes) were responsible for jointly taking over his role, the latter became Coldplay's sole manager as of 2006. After the promotion campaign for X&Y (2005) was over, he returned as the band's friend and "learned to be useful" as the years passed, which included discovering how to design a live show, make videos, do A&R and "just sort of fill in the gaps". Harvey's participation in Coldplay's line-up was stressed by other members in a direct appeal to Wikipedia where they asked fans and "Wikipedia Enthusiasts" to rectify errors on their page.   

His name has also been included in the liner notes for every album since Viva la Vida or Death and All His Friends (2008). He has made cameo appearances in numerous music videos, including "Life in Technicolor II", as the man carrying a video camera; "Christmas Lights", where he was one of the Elvises playing violin; "Paradise", as a zookeeper chasing the runaway elephant; and "A Sky Full of Stars", being featured on a koala costume. Harvey often answer questions and requests from fans on Coldplay's social media as well, where his bandmates have described him as "the wise, handsome, frightening one who tells us what to do".

Personal life
Although Harvey's estimated wealth remains unknown, it was reported in 2019 that he purchased a house in Brentwood, Los Angeles for $15 million, where he currently resides with his wife Yasmin. The couple have three children. During his years apart from Coldplay, he travelled around South America, studied psychotherapy and counselling at Regent's College and attained a psychology degree at University of Melbourne. Harvey also volunteered at Upbeat, a small community mental health project in Camden which supported musicians who had mental health issues by providing workshops, equipment, rehearsal space and assistance with promotion and recording. He was later named the institution's vice-president and Coldplay their patrons. On the verge of starting a NHS training as a clinical psychologist, Harvey was asked to rejoin the band in 2006.

Discography

 Parachutes (2000)
 A Rush of Blood to the Head (2002)
 X&Y (2005)
 Viva la Vida or Death and All His Friends (2008)
 Mylo Xyloto (2011)
 Ghost Stories (2014)
 A Head Full of Dreams (2015)
 Everyday Life (2019)
 Music of the Spheres (2021)

See also
 List of Trinity College, Oxford people
 List of University of Melbourne people
 List of British Grammy winners and nominees
 List of highest-grossing live music artists

Notes

References

Further reading

External links

 
 Coldplay Official Website
 Coldplay on AllMusic

1976 births
Living people
Alumni of Trinity College, Oxford
Atlantic Records artists
Capitol Records artists
Coldplay members
Creative directors
English music managers
Parlophone artists
People educated at Sherborne School
People from Bristol
University of Melbourne alumni